The Delahaye Type 175 is a luxury, bespoke, coachbuilt automobile manufactured by French automotive product manufacturer Delahaye. Production build numbers were formally recorded from early 1948 to mid 1951, validating that 107 cars were built.
 
This run of 4.5-litre chassis was offered in a variety of styles, exclusively built by coachbuilders. Delahaye did not have its own coachbuilding capability.

A 1953 fire in the administration and drawing offices destroyed most of its files and technical drawings. Little is known about the Type 175 and its siblings, the sequentially longer wheelbased Types 178 and 180.

Club Delahaye has recorded 25 surviving cars, out of the 107 confirmed built. There were 51 Type 175 cars, most being the optional 175S variant. There were 38 Type 178 cars, at least one of which was factory-built with both 175S options that were not offered on that model. There were 18 Type 180 cars, two of which have the optional 175S engine, both being heavily-armoured Chapron bodied limousines.

Initial design

The Type 165, a 4.5-litre, V12 engined, grand-touring car, elevated Delahaye's prewar prestige to the pinnacle. But it was a flash-in-the-pan that could not economically be sustained. The Type 165 was replaced by the 4.5-litre Type 175, in early 1948. Managing Director Charles Weiffenbach had planned to debut the Type 175 at the October 1939 Paris Auto Salon to sustain the momentum generated by the discontinued Type 165, of which just 4 were built. The Paris Salon was where Delahaye wrote most of its purchase-orders, but the venue was cancelled without notice, due to an impending German invasion.

The shareholders had decided that a simpler, practical, 4.5-litre engine - one litre larger than the Type 135, but familiar to Delahaye's workers - accompanied by a new, state-of-the-art chassis was to supersede the impractical Type 165, and replace the Types 134, 135, 138 and 148L by 1940. That, however, did not occur as France was plunged into war in early June 1940.

The prototype evolved beyond its initial 1939 guise and was finally presented to the shareholders for production approval in March 1944. The four-wheel independent suspension was a first for Delahaye, and it was the first Delahaye to be built exclusively in left-hand drive. Testing of the untried and unproven mechanicals was not yet possible, due to the ongoing German occupation of Paris and the factory. The introduction had to await the belated return of the Paris Auto Salon, in October 1946. The new model would have been state-of-the-art modern, had it debuted in 1939. It was less so, eight years later, yet, it was one of the few new lines there.

After the war, the Types 135 and 148L had to be re-introduced, to generate cashflow. The company's Delage D6-70 model continued as it was before the war, but the straight-eight engined Delage D8-120 was discontinued. Delahaye's directors could not allow its large displacement Delage to compete against the Types 175, 178 and 180.

The Type 175 had a naturally aspirated, 4.5-litre, overhead-valve, inline six-cylinder engine, with seven rather than four main bearings, and a twelve port cylinder head instead of nine Ports. The chassis featured Dubonnet independent front suspension built under license; an independent De Dion rear suspension system; large diameter, deeply finned drums on a dual Lockheed hydraulic brake system; a four-speed, semi-automatic Cotal transmission manufactured by MAAG; left-hand drive for the first time by Delahaye; and eighteen inch wheels. 

The chassis, with its cockpit floor welded as a stressed structural member, on the bottom, rather than on top of the chassis, had exceptional strength and torsional rigidity.

Developmental evolution was set back by the unexpected death of chief design-engineer Jean Francois, in April 1944. Delahaye had nobody qualified to assume his role. His absence resulted in extended delays (DELAHAYE Le Grand Livre by Jacque Dorizon and co-authors), causing Delahaye to resort to trial-and-error experimentation while still building somewhat outdated pre-war designs to generate revenue.

Six pre-production chassis became known about by 1946, to the specifically involved factory-workers; senior management; the  directors; and, a few with insiders' knowledge. For specific identification during the sequential evolution, and testing processes, five of the six were referred to by painted identity numbers: 90001; 91001; 91002; 92001, and 92002. The other was not numbered, being the distinctive Paris Auto Salon show chassis, that was incompletely assembled, to represent the optional Type 175S. The first three numbers referred to Type 175 units, and the latter two, prefixed '920' represented the Type 178. There was no precursor to the Type 180.

The six were built sequentially and were not precisely replicated. Each had alterations made for improved manufacturing and profitability. The unique entity the directors approved in March 1944, predated the six pre-production units by about two years. That time was required for experiments and testing, from September 1944, until November 1945.

Of the 51 cars built on the short, 2.95-meter wheelbase Type 175 chassis, 12 cars reportedly exist, most being the optional variant with three Solex 40-AiP carburetors, and chromed Rudge-Whitworth wire wheels. Those were the only factory options, limited to the Type 175S; but exceptions were made. Of the 38 Type 178s built on the median length, 3.15-meter wheelbase chassis, 7 are recorded as surviving. And, of the 18 long, 3.35-metre wheelbase Type 180 chassis, 6 survive.

Charles Weiffenbach, the managing director of operations, who ran the company single-handedly since his appointment in 1906, devised the intentionally confused reference number strategy. His objective was to obfuscate the identity of the six evolutionary forerunners; and, the prototype. All seven would be surreptitiously liquidated, in early 1948, to recover some of the corporate developmental investment. 

The postwar front design was created by in-house industrial designer Philippe Charbonneaux, who developed the distinctive Delahaye "face". His effort provided the design of the entire front with a narrower, elongated, heart-shape grille with horizontal bars, and low horizontal grilles on each side. Delahaye required its coachbuilders to use the new frontal aspect although coachbuilders Joseph Figoni, Henri Chapron, Jacques Saoutchik, and Marcel Pourtout, obtained authorized artistic license.

Development
Although production officially started in early 1948 as announced, there were six pre-production units by 1946, known to select factory-workers and those with insiders' knowledge. There was also the experimental prototype that was the only example built in strict accordance with chief design-engineer Jean Francois' preliminary engineering drawings and specifications. Fernand Lacour, proprietor of The Wilson Garage, was a performance consultant to Delahaye. The six early units were referred to, as: 90001; 91001, 91002, 92001, 92002; and, the glitzy 1946-1949 Paris Auto Salon show-chassis, presented in optional Type 175S guise.

The Type 175/178/180 prototype was not one of those six, having predated them by over two years, and kept aside for developmental reference. It was not numbered, nor otherwise identified, since as a prototype it was a one-off, unique, aberration. The prototype was eventually identified through research and discovered provenance documentation in 2014. 

Managing director Weiffenbach cleverly devised the intentionally convoluted reference-number strategy, to obscure the identity of the pre-production units,to differentiate them from the prototype. It took decades to determine Weiffenbach's strategy, to arrive at conclusions about what happened to the early pre-production chassis, and the prototype. All six evolutionary units were liquidated, having been formally stamped with production build numbers. All six were homologation tested, certified, registered, and licensed as bespoke, coachbuilt cars. The prototype seemingly vanished without a trace. It was finally recognized in 2012, when it was discovered that the Type 178 chassis, stamped as 820001, was the long lost "missing link".
 
After World War II, the second-generation 4.5-litre series was to address the export market, ostensibly in North America, under the five-year economic revitalization strategy known as the "Pons Plan".

Delahaye's second generation 4.5-litre engine was an overhead-valve, inline, six-cylinder, similar to the preceding Type 135 in format, but a litre larger in displacement. It was an improvement over the successful Type 135 engine, in having seven main bearings versus four, and a twelve-port instead of nine-port cylinder-head. Unlike the cast-iron block and head of prior models, the 4.5-liter engine had a cast-aluminum block, and cast-iron head, separated by a copper and asbestos head-gasket. The standard compression ratio was 6.5:1, but that was enhanced in the optional Type 175S, that was fitted with three Solex carburetors, instead of one; and, wire wheels.

By 1946, those familiar with Delahaye knew of the six pre-production units. But those six excluded the developmental experiment that was presented to the shareholding directors in March 1944 by Charles Weiffenbach, in the unavoidable absence of chief design-engineer Jean Francois, for production approval. The prototype remained unidentified. It was superseded when the first and second pre-production units (reference numbers 90001 and 91001) were sequentially fabricated in late 1945, in Type 275S specification. The 1946–49 Paris Auto Salon Type 175S show-chassis was the fourth of the six built, but was not operational, there being no fuel-line, electrical equipment, mechanical linkages, and switches.

Chassis
The new 175/178/180 series chassis introduced the semi-monocoque concept. These units were completely different from the foregoing Type 135 and its several longer wheelbased iterations, in width, proportions, and structure. The stressed-steel floor-pan, welded integrally around the bottom perimeter of the passenger compartment. The chassis was dramatically larger, and heavier, than the Type 135. It had parallel side-rails, and these longitudinal members were boxed, instead of open channels. Type 135,145, 148L, and 165 frame-rails tapered from the aft cockpit cross-member forward, whereas the three new models' cockpits were parallel-sided rectangles, setting the precedent.

The Types 135,145,148,155, and 165 had the identical,proprietary, independent front suspension system shared with Delage, and Talbot. In contrast, the all-new 4.5-liter chassis employed an innovative, sophisticated, but unfamiliar, independent front suspension, being the recently introduced Dubonnet system, licensed to Delahaye by the inventor. 

Dubonnet's system was in use prior to the Delahaye, having been licensed to General Motors two years before, in 1933, as well as by Alfa-Romeo, Simca, and Vauxhall. After WW2, only Vauxhall and Delahaye retained the Dubonnet system. Others had moved on to the unequal-length A-arm system, pioneered by Cadillac head engineer Maurice Olly. The GMC system was licensed by Rolls-Royce, for its Phantom-111 and Wraith model, and it subsequent postwar Silver Dawn, Silver Wraith and Bentley Mk-6 models.

Dubonnet systems proved problematic, unless fastidiously maintained. Oil-seal leaks caused seizures,and suspension collapses. Accidental damages were sustained by an undisclosed number of early cars in the 175/178/180 series. Parts failure reports doomed the new series to failure, irreparably damaging Delahaye's long respected reputation. 

The excessive weight of traditional hardwood body-frames clad in mild steel panelled, hand-hammered and welded coachwork, mounted atop these already heavy chassis adversely affected acceleration and speed, while compromising handling. French coachbuilders employed antiquated, traditional, building methods and common materials. They were almost universally oblivious to weight. Only Henri Chapron, and Olivier Lecanu-Deschamp, were familiar with forming and welding aluminum. Other French coachbuilders were creating their bodies with hand-hammered and welded steel sheets mechanically fastened over hardwood body-frames. Consequently, they were inordinately heavy, and contributed to mechanical failures experienced by an estimated dozen early purchasers. Broken suspension components resulted in Delahaye being obliged to buy back the offending cars, at considerable expense, to circumvent litigation, and negative publicity.

The Type 175S racing-engines Delahaye developed for Charles Pozzi, and racing-team Ecurie Lutetia co-owner and French champion driver Eugene Chabaud, reportedly had a 9.1:1 compression ratio, which with three Stromberg dual-choke carburetors, delivered over 220 bhp. These two 4.5-litre displacement racecars were parallel in horsepower to three of the four Type 145 cars (48772, 48773, and 48775). The more highly-tuned number 48771, after Fernand Lacour's efforts, developed a recorded 244.8 horsepower.

The Type 175S model had just two factory options: Rudge wire-spoked wheels; and three Solex 40AiP down-draft carburetors. Coachbuilders addressed everything else a customer desired or specified.

The new 4.5-litre engine carried the "183" casting-code. The motors were built in two distinct forms. The initial engines were stamped: Type 1AL-183, as found in all six pre-production units known about by 1946; and, the two Type 175S racing-engines that Delahaye loaned to Charles Pozzi and his Ecurie Lutetia co-owning team-mate, Eugene Chabaud. Three Type 175S racing-engined competition coupes were built for Jean Trevoux (815042, 815050 and 815051). The 175S racing-engines numbered no more than five. 

Most production motors were stamped Type 2AL-183 (Auto-historians Andre Vaucourt, and jean-Paul Tissot). These came out of revised casting-mold "183". Modifications were made for production efficiency, cost-effectiveness, and alleged crankcase reinforcement.

History

After having spent four years of World War II building railroad rolling stock parts for German trains, Delahaye was then included in deputy director General Paul-Marie Pons' 1945 plan Pons for French industry and engineering. This was a five-year program to rebuild French industry, and source incoming capital for French companies. The plan designated Delahaye to build sports and luxury cars for the export market, to generate foreign currency. Over 80 percent of the company's automobile chassis were exported to France's colonies, including in Africa and Asia.

In consideration of the expense of  producing the complicated, unreliable, impractical V-12 used in the four Type 145 sports-racers; and, the Type 155 monoposto (all five V12 racecars were made exclusively for Lucy O'Reilly Schell for her team Écurie Bleue), as well as the four Type 165 grand-touring cars, V12 production ended in late 1938, with twelve sets of engine parts made, resulting in those nine cars.

The V-12 was replaced by a new, conventional, less complex, inline, overhead-valve, six-cylinder engine of the same 4.5-liter Engine displacement. 

The show-chassis debuted in optionally equipped Type 175S form, with a partially built body by Letourneur & Marchand, introducing  Delahaye's new postwar "face". It was one of the few new machines at the first postwar Paris Auto Salon, in October 1946. It garnered considerable attention, and Delahaye's first model to be manufactured exclusively in left-hand-drive.

The chassis was neither fully developed nor adequately tested by October 1946, before parts were put into production in late November 1947. Problems  with the Dubonnet front suspension soon became apparent. Disgruntled owners experienced parts failures, and sustained accidental damages. Delahaye was obliged to buy back an undisclosed number of defective cars, at great expense to the company, to defuse litigation and curtail negative publicity.

The mechanically and structurally unchanged show-chassis reappeared on Delahaye's stand in 1947,1948, and 1949 for the final time, each year with minor additions made to freshen the partial forward coachwork. 

The extended delivery delay, into early 1948, instead of 1946, was due to chief design-engineer Jean Francois' unanticipated death, in April 1944. Delahaye had nobody qualified to take his place.

The production build number list verified that 51 Type 175 chassis were built (815001 to 815051), including the Type 175S Show-chassis, that was cycled back into production, after the October 1949 show. It likely went into the tail-end of Type 175S production. 

While not a success in the marketplace, a Type 175S won the 1951 Monte Carlo Rally, This car (815042) finished twelfth in the Carrera Panamericana, while a second Motto-bodied 175S coupe (815051) was disqualified on a technicality. 

The optional 175S had three Solex 40AiP carburettors and Rudge wire-spoked wheels, but was otherwise identical to the standard Type 175, with a short, 2.95-metre wheelbase. The other two longer wheelbased versions were the Types 178 and 180, with a single Solex carburetor, and stamped steel wheels. The standard 175 had a reported 140 horsepower, with 161 hp for the 175S. The Production Build List confirms there were 38 of the 3.15-metre wheelbase Type 178 chassis; and, 18 of the 3.35-meter Type 180, built  and 180 (333.5 cm) mainly for heads of state, dignitaries, corporate executives, and the like. Two Chapron armoured Type 180 limousines were built for the leaders of the French Communist Party in 1948. A prototype "Delage D180" was also developed on this basis, but was not put into production. Delahaye focused its Delage production on the D6-70 model. 

Total production of three-chassis series, including the prototype, and the show-chassis, was 107 automobiles. (substantiated by Club Delahaye president Jean-Paul Tissot, from archived company records) 

The rear-wheel drive Type 175, 178 and 180 chassis is considerably more sophisticated than its Type 135 predecessor. The independent front suspension had horizontally pivoting cylindrical housings that contained a coil-spring and hydraulic shock absorber immersed in an oil-bath Dubonnet. The rear was by de Dion, with semi-elliptical springs. Brakes were dual system hydraulic by Lockheed. The brake-drums were deeply finned cast-iron, actuated by dual master cylinders with a balance-bar.

The custom bodies of these cars were often much too heavy for what the chassis had originally been engineered for. In dry conditions, they were fast cars, but wet-weather handling was unpredictable. Another culprit was inferior quality of high-tensile-strength steel in the early postwar era. The specified grade was depleted by the war, and what little was produced was allocated by the French government, which did not prioritize luxury carmakers. The Types 175, 178 and 180 ceased production in 1951. Although Delahaye managed to introduce the Type 235 in 1951, it was only an updated variation of the Type 135. Delahaye and Delage combined production dropped from 511 in 1949 to 41 in 1952 and 36 in 1953.

In desperation to salvage the company after the devastating 1953 fire, Managing Director Weiffenbach tried to amalgamate with various French automakers, to no avail. He eventually orchestrated a Delahaye shareholder-approved merger, as the minority partner, with Hotchkiss. Delahaye (and Delage) closed down for good on December 31, 1954. Hothkiss in turn merged with weapons manufacturers Brandt in 1956.

Bibliography
 Hull, Peter. Delahaye: Famous on Road and Race Track, in Ward, Ian. World of Automobiles, Volume 5, pp. 521–524. London: Orbis, 1974.

References

1950s cars
Delahaye vehicles
Rear-wheel-drive vehicles
Cars introduced in 1947